Josée Lacasse may refer to:

Josée Lacasse is a Canadian former alpine skier who competed in the 1988 Winter Olympics.
Josée Lacasse (rugby) is a Canadian female rugby union player.